Doina Ofelia Melinte (née Beșliu on 27 December 1956) is a retired Romanian middle-distance runner. She competed at four Olympics (1980–92), and won a gold medal in the 800 metres and a silver medal in the 1500 metres in 1984. She won the world indoor title in 1987 and 1989 and the European indoor title in 1985, 1988 and 1990 in the 1500 m. Her world indoor mile record of 4:17.41 in 1990, stood for 26 years.

Career
Melinte competed as Doina Beșliu at the 1980 Moscow Olympics and reached the semi-finals of the 800 metres. In 1982, now competing as Doina Melinte, she was the fastest woman in the world at 800 metres but only finished sixth in the final of that years European Championships in Athens. She also finished sixth in both the 800 m and 1500 m at the 1983 World Championships in Helsinki.

At the 1984 Los Angeles Olympics, she won a gold medal in the 800 metres ahead of Kim Gallagher of the US and countrywoman Fiţa Lovin, and a silver medal in the 1500 metres behind Gabriella Dorio of Italy and ahead of another Romanian, Maricica Puică. She won a 1500 m bronze medal at the 1986 European Championships, behind the Soviet pair of Ravilya Agletdinova and Tatyana Samolenko. In March 1987, she won the 1500 m at the World Indoor Championships in Indianapolis, ahead of Samolenko. In September of that year, she won a bronze medal at the World Championships in Rome. She originally finished fourth but was promoted one position after the disqualification of original bronze medal winner Sandra Gasser.

At her third Olympic Games in Seoul 1988, she finished a disappointing ninth in the 1500 m final won by her team-mate Paula Ivan. In 1989, she defended her 1500 m World Indoor title in Budapest, winning in a championship record of 4:04.79. In February 1990, she broke the world indoor mile record with 4:17.14 in East Rutherford. The record stood for 26 years until Genzebe Dibaba ran 4:13.31 in 2016. A month later, she won her third European Indoor title over 1500 m in Glasgow. A medal favourite for the 1990 European Championships in Split, she could only finish sixth in the 1500 m final. In 1991, she was fourth in the 1500 m finals at both the World Indoor Championships in Seville and the World Championships in Tokyo.

Melinte concluded her international career at the 1992 Barcelona Olympics, where she dropped out of the 1500 m final.

Personal life
Melinte first wanted to be a gymnast or a ballerina, but did not have adequate conditions for training. She then played handball before changing to athletics. Around 1980–82 she married her coach Dorin Melinte, and after retiring from competitions in 1992 became a coach herself. In 2010–2012 she served as director of the National Agency for Youth and Sports (Autoritatea Naţională pentru Sport şi Tineret) and later became vice president of the national anti-doping agency.

International competitions

References

External links 
 
 

1956 births
Living people
Romanian female middle-distance runners
Athletes (track and field) at the 1980 Summer Olympics
Athletes (track and field) at the 1984 Summer Olympics
Athletes (track and field) at the 1988 Summer Olympics
Athletes (track and field) at the 1992 Summer Olympics
Olympic athletes of Romania
Olympic gold medalists for Romania
Olympic silver medalists for Romania
World Athletics Championships medalists
European Athletics Championships medalists
Medalists at the 1984 Summer Olympics
Olympic gold medalists in athletics (track and field)
Olympic silver medalists in athletics (track and field)
Universiade medalists in athletics (track and field)
Universiade gold medalists for Romania
World Athletics Indoor Championships winners
Medalists at the 1981 Summer Universiade
Medalists at the 1983 Summer Universiade